Kamer Krasniqi (born 11 January 1996) is a professional footballer who plays as a midfielder for 3. Liga club VfB Oldenburg. Born in Germany, he has represented the Kosovo U21 national team at international level.

Club career
Born in Osnabrück, Germany, Krasniqi joined VfL Osnabrück in 2009. In June he signed a professional contract with the club due to run until 2018, having made his 3. Liga debut during the 2015–16 season. During his time at Osnabrück he made 30 appearances in the 3. Liga.

Krasniqi joined Regionalliga Nord side Schwarz-Weiß Rehden in summer 2019. He made 22 appearances in the 2019–20 season scoring five goals and making two assists. In January 2020 he joined Sonnenhof Großaspach of the 3. Liga until the end of the season. Sonnenhof Großaspach was relegated.

Krasniqi returned to Schwarz-Weiß Rehden in summer 2020. At the end of the 2021–22 season, in which he scored 16 goals and assisted 9 in 29 appearances, he received contract offers from multiple 3. Liga clubs.

In summer 2022 Krasniqi agreed a move to VfB Oldenburg which at the time was playing for promotion to the 3. Liga.

International career
On 5 June 2017. Krasniqi received a call-up from Kosovo U21 for a 2019 UEFA European Under-21 Championship qualification match against Norway U21 and making his debut after being named in the starting line-up.

Style of play
Krasniqi is known for his stamina and ball control.

References

External links
 
 

1996 births
Living people
German people of Kosovan descent
Sportspeople from Osnabrück
Kosovan footballers
German footballers
Association football midfielders
Kosovo under-21 international footballers
Kosovo youth international footballers
3. Liga players
Regionalliga players
VfL Osnabrück players
BSV Schwarz-Weiß Rehden players
SG Sonnenhof Großaspach players
VfB Oldenburg players